VTT Technical Research Centre of Finland Ltd is a state-owned and controlled non-profit limited liability company. VTT is the largest research and technology company and research centre conducting applied research in Finland. It provides research and innovation services and information for domestic and international customers and partners, both in private and public sectors.

VTT is part of Finland's innovation system and operates under the mandate of the Ministry of Economic Affairs and Employment.

History

Technical Research Institute of Finland (VTL) (1942–1972)
VTT – then called the Technical Research Institute of Finland (VTL) – was founded on 16 January 1942 by President Risto Ryti’s decree. Its mission was to engage in technical research for the benefit of science and society as a whole. Construction started immediately, and the research institute was completed in autumn 1943. The volume of the building was 20,000 cubic metres, and seven of VTT’s first ten laboratories were placed in the building. After the war, VTT expanded rapidly and was particularly occupied with the quality assurance of war compensation products.

In 1950, the research institute comprised 15 laboratories. The state bought the land of Otaniemi Manor in 1949, and in 1955 the laboratory of mining technology moved to Otaniemi as the first VTT laboratory.

In the 1960s, VTT grew to be the largest research institute in Finland, employing more than 400 people. VTT was an internationally recognised research centre.

In the 1970s, the research institute underwent extensive modernisation, such as simplifying the administration and expanding the testing activities to research.

Technical Research Centre of Finland (VTT) (1972–2009)
In March 1972, the Technical Research Institute of Finland changed its name to Technical Research Centre of Finland (VTT, Valtion teknillinen tutkimuskeskus, National Technical Research Centre). VTT received new tasks due to the strong growth and diversification of industrial activities. It also participated in research related to the restructuring of society. The activities focused on technology research and the associated development work.

In 1990, VTT had almost 6,000 cubic metres of underground laboratory space in Otaniemi and 15,000 square metres excavated at a depth exceeding 20 metres.

In June 2007, the Ministerial Working Group on Administration and Regional Development supported the proposal of the Ministry of Industry and Trade to launch the preparatory work for transforming VTT into a state enterprise in early 2009.

VTT Technical Research Centre of Finland (2010–2014)
A new name was introduced in 2010: VTT Technical Research Centre of Finland. VTT was divided structurally into groups. In addition to the parent company VTT, the new VTT Group consisted of three subsidiaries: VTT Expert Services Ltd, VTT Ventures Ltd and VTT International Ltd. VTT Memsfab Ltd started its operations in 2011.

In 2012, VTT had more than 3,000 employees.

In January 2014, VTT reformed its organisation and divided its operations into three business areas:
 Knowledge Intensive Products and Services,
 Smart Industry and Energy Systems; and
 Solutions for Natural Resources and the Environment.

In May 2014, the Government proposed that VTT would be made a limited liability company and that Mikes and VTT would be merged. According to the Ministry of Economic Affairs and Employment, VTT operated in a very businesslike manner: it received about 70 per cent of its income from commissions assigned by companies and research funding open to competition.

VTT Technical Research Centre of Finland Ltd (2015–)
In January 2015, the Centre for Metrology (MIKES) was merged with VTT, and VTT Technical Research Centre of Finland became a limited liability company. The company’s field of activity was defined as applied research in technology, taking research results to practical use, and operating as a national metrology institute. As a limited liability company, VTT was able to react more easily to changes in the customers and the environment, and to operate more freely in the financial markets. Bioruukki, a research centre for the bioeconomy and circular economy, was established in Kivenlahti, Espoo. Its aim was to overcome the ‘valley of death’ associated with the commercialisation of inventions.

In January 2018, VTT sold Labtium Ltd and VTT Expert Services Ltd, which provided testing, inspection and certification services, to Eurofins Scientific Group. In May, it was announced that VTT would start coordinating a European consortium of more than 10 million euros to develop commercial applications for high-temperature SOFC fuel cell technology.

In 2019, VTT launched its own incubator activities, VTT Launchpad, through which it provided support for research teams in setting up businesses. In December, VTT established a unit focusing on autonomous mobility in Turku, VTT Senseway.

In May 2020, VTT announced that it would acquire Finland’s first quantum computer. Its aim was to build a 50-qubit quantum computer. The Finnish IQM Finland Oy, which works with quantum computing, was selected as the supplier of the quantum computer.

Organization

VTT’s head office is located in Otaniemi, Espoo. The President and CEO is Antti Vasara, DSc (Tech.). In addition to Espoo, VTT has offices in Jyväskylä, Kajaani, Kuopio, Tampere and Oulu.

In 2022, VTT has four subsidiaries:
VTT Ventures Ltd
VTT International Ltd
VTT SenseWay Oy
VTT Holding Oy

VTT also has five key initiatives, which it calls the technologies of exponential hope and growth
 biotechnology in food production,
 quantum technology,
 optimising the use of material,
 small nuclear reactors and
 chemical plastics recycling

VTT’s activities and impact

VTT receives research funding from the state to perform its basic task, but the state-funded research activities are separated from the company’s market-based activities.

Partners
Some of VTT's partners:
 VTT and Lappeenranta University of Technology have jointly developed a small nuclear power plant that produces district heating. It could be used to cover the district heating needs of an entire city.
 Fazer has licensed an oats technology developed by VTT, which makes it possible to utilise the health improving properties of oat.
 VTT and Rolls-Royce are designing the first-generation remotely controlled and autonomous ships.
 In autumn 2020, a multidisciplinary research project was launched in Finland to investigate the spread of COVID-19 in the air. The research results of the joint project of VTT, Finnish Institute for Health and Welfare and the University of Tampere were expected to be completed in early 2021.
 VTT is involved in the L3Pilot project, which is part of the EU's Horizon 2020 programme, in which extensive road tests are carried out on robot cars. The project comprises 34 organisations and is led by the German Volkswagen Group.
 VTT delivers components for the French ITER experimental fusion reactor using fusion power.
 VTT has studied sisu – a Finnish concept that denotes a unique blend of hardiness, phlegmatic determination and gritty courage – with the University of Helsinki Department of Psychology. The study focused on the essence and significance of sisu in areas such as coping and well-being at work.
 VTT and Finnish Textile and Fashion have drawn up a policy on how to develop the value chain of the textile industry in Finland.

Examples of research results

 In 2014, VTT announced that it had produced a highly accurate hyperspectral camera to detect the precursors of skin cancer earlier than before. The health technology company Revenio began commercialising the technology the following year.
 In 2015, it was reported that VTT had succeeded in developing hybrid yeasts to create new flavours in lager and to speed up the manufacturing process.
 In 2015, VTT announced that it had developed a sensor that can be attached to food packaging, which detects the spoilage of food by searching for ethanol accumulated in the packaging.
 In 2015, VTT conducted a study for the Finnish Air Force, which made it possible to extend the lifespan of Hornet’s high-pressure turbine wings while saving about 2.7 million euros.
 Electric buses developed by VTT were introduced in Helsinki Regional Transport Authority in Espoo in 2015 and Helsinki in 2016.
 In 2016, VTT said that it had developed a mobile application and a small accessory to detect the user’s heart arrhythmias. The product may also help prevent strokes.
 MetsäSpring textile fibres use ionic solutions to process yarn from bleached coniferous pulp.
 The Biocelsol technology developed by VTT and Tampere University of Technology uses enzymes to improve the dissolution of cellulose. The end result is similar to cotton.

VTT’s spin-offs
Spin-off companies have emerged from VTT’s research results, including
 Dispelix that develops lenses for augmented reality (AR) glasses
 GrainSense, which has developed a wireless, hand-held device for measuring grain quality
 Infinited Fibre Company, which manufactures new textile fibre from old textiles or recycled paper
 Iscent, which produces packaging and printing technologies
 Origin By Ocean aims to solve the problem of eutrophication by collecting algae from the sea and using its molecules to make emulsifiers for the food industry
 Paptic, which has commercialised the plastic-like paper material developed at VTT. The material can be used to replace, for example, traditional plastic bags
 Solar Foods, which produces protein from the air
 Spinnova, transforming cellulosic fiber into fiber for the textile industry
 Volare, which refines food industry waste and black soldier flies into protein for fish feed and pet food markets, and insect oils for the cosmetics industry.

Commercialised VTT innovations
VTT’s research results have also generated products.
 The eniferBio company produces fish feed with the help of a Pekilo mycoprotein found in VTT’s microbial culture collection.
 Goodwiller and VTT have developed a Promilless alcohol test for private use, which can be used to measure the blood alcohol content from saliva.
 Salofa has commercialised the world’s only rapid test for blue-green algae developed by VTT and the University of Turku.

Recognition
 In October 2020, VTT won the Impact Expected category in an innovation competition for European research institutes in Brussels with an innovation that enabled the production of egg white protein without chickens or eggs. The method utilised a decomposer fungus refined in the laboratory.

References

External links 
 

Research institutes in Finland
Members of the European Research Consortium for Informatics and Mathematics
1942 establishments in Finland
Organizations established in 1942